Toplicioara may refer to the following rivers in Romania:

 Toplicioara, a tributary of the Șoimuș in Bihor County
 Toplicioara, a tributary of the Voievodeasa in Harghita County
 Toplicioara cu Apă, a tributary of the Bâlta in Gorj County

See also 
 Toplița River (disambiguation)